The 1935–36 Coppa Italia Final was a single match played on 11 June 1936, between Torino and Alessandria at the Stadio Luigi Ferraris in Genoa.

It was the first Coppa Italia final since 1922; in fact this tournament was not organized in the 1923–1925 and 1928–1935 periods; 1926–27 edition was interrupted after few rounds.

Both Torino and Alessandria were playing in Serie A at that time. To reach the final match, Torino defeated in succession Reggiana (2–0), Catania (8–2), Livorno (4–2 after extra time) and Fiorentina (2–0); all those matches were played in Turin, as decided by drawing.
Alessandria at first eliminated Cremonese (4–1) away, then defeated Modena (4–0), Lazio (1–0) and Milano (1–0) playing on its field.

About 10,000 people followed the final match in Genoa, for a 62,000 Italian lire profit. The referee was Raffaele Mastellari from Bologna.

Match

References

Sources
 Almanacco Illustrato del Calcio – La Storia 1898–2004, Panini Edizioni, Modena, September 2005

Coppa Italia Final
Coppa Italia Finals
Coppa Italia Final 1936
Coppa Italia Final 1936